Amalda rottnestensis is a species of sea snail, a marine gastropod mollusk in the family Ancillariidae.

Description

Distribution

References

rottnestensis
Gastropods described in 1991